Derek Mahon (23 November 1941 – 1 October 2020) was an Irish poet. He was born in Belfast, Northern Ireland but lived in a number of cities around the world.  At his death it was noted that his, "influence in the Irish poetry community, literary world and society at large, and his legacy, is immense".  President of Ireland Michael D Higgins said of Mahon; "he shared with his northern peers the capacity to link the classical and the contemporary but he brought also an edge that was unsparing of cruelty and wickedness."

Biography
Derek Mahon was born on 23 November 1941 as the only child of Ulster Protestant working-class parents. His father and grandfather worked at Harland and Wolff while his mother worked at a local flax mill. During his childhood, he claims he was something of a solitary dreamer, comfortable with his own company yet aware of the world around him. Interested in literature from an early age, he attended Skegoneill Primary school and then the Royal Belfast Academical Institution, or "Inst".

At Inst he encountered fellow students who shared his interest in literature and poetry. The school produced a magazine to which Mahon produced some of his early poems. According to the critic Hugh Haughton his early poems were highly fluent and extraordinary for a person so young. His parents could not see the point of poetry, but he set out to prove them wrong after he won his school's Forrest Reid Memorial Prize for the poem ‘The power that gives the water breath‘.

Mahon pursued third level studies at Trinity College, Dublin in French, English, and Philosophy and where he edited Icarus, and formed many friendships with writers such as Michael Longley, Eavan Boland and Brendan Kennelly. He started to mature as a poet. He left Trinity in 1965 to take up studies at the Sorbonne in Paris.

After leaving the Sorbonne in 1966 he worked his way through Canada and the United States. In 1968, while spending a year teaching English at Belfast High School, he published his first collection of poems Night Crossing. He later taught in a school in Dublin and worked in London as a freelance journalist. He  lived in Kinsale, Co. Cork. On 23 March 2007 he was awarded the David Cohen Prize for Literature. He won the Poetry Now Award in 2006 for his collection, Harbour Lights, and again in 2009 for his Life on Earth collection.

At times expressing anti-establishment values, Mahon has described himself as, an ‘aesthete’ with a penchant ‘for left-wingery […] to which, perhaps naively, I adhere.’

His papers are held at Emory University.

In March 2020, at the beginning of the COVID-19 pandemic, RTÉ News ended its evening broadcast with Mahon reading his poem Everything Is Going to Be All Right.

On 1 October 2020, Mahon died in Cork after a short illness, aged 78.

He is survived by his partner Sarah Iremonger and his three children, Rory, Katy, and Maisie.

Style
Thoroughly educated and with a keen understanding of literary tradition, Mahon came out of the tumult of Northern Ireland with a formal, moderate, even restrained poetic voice. In an era of free verse, Mahon has often written in received forms, using a broadly applied version of iambic pentameter that, metrically, resembles the "sprung foot" verse of Gerard Manley Hopkins. Some poems rhyme. Even the Irish landscape itself is never all that far from the classical tradition, as in his poem "Achill":
Croagh Patrick towers like Naxos over the water
And I think of my daughter at work on her difficult art
And wish she were with me now between thrush and plover,
Wild thyme and sea-thrift, to lift the weight from my heart.
He has also explored the genre of ekphrasis: the poetic reinterpretation of visual art. In that respect he has been interested in 17th century Dutch and Flemish art.

Bibliography

Poetry

Collections
 1965: Twelve Poems. Festival Publications, Belfast
 1968: Night-Crossing. Oxford University Press
 1970: Ecclesiastes Phoenix Pamphlet Poets
 1970: Beyond Howth Head. Dolmen Press
 1972: Lives. Oxford University Press
 1975: The Snow Party. Oxford University Press
 1977: In Their Element. Arts Council of Northern Ireland
 1979: Poems 1962–1978. Oxford University Press
 1981: Courtyards in Delft. Gallery Press
 1982: The Hunt By Night. Oxford University Press
 1985: Antarctica. Gallery Press
 1990: The Chinese Restaurant in Portrush: Selected Poems. Gallery Press
 1991: Selected Poems. Viking
 1992: The Yaddo Letter. Gallery Press
 1995: The Hudson Letter. Gallery Press; Wake Forest University Press, 1996
 1997: The Yellow Book. Gallery Press; Wake Forest University Press, 1998
 1999: Collected Poems. Gallery Press
 2001: Selected Poems. Penguin
 2005: Harbour Lights. Gallery Press (winner of the 2006 Irish Times Poetry Now Award)
 2007: Somewhere the Wave. Gallery Press
 2008: Life on Earth. Gallery Press (shortlisted for the 2009 International Griffin Poetry Prize; winner of the 2009 Irish Times Poetry Now Award)
 2010: An Autumn Wind. Gallery Press
 2011: New Collected Poems. Gallery Press
 2016: New Selected Poems. Faber & Faber; Gallery Press
 2021: The Poems (1961-2020). Gallery Press

Translations / versions / editions
 1982: The Chimeras (a version of Les Chimères, by Nerval), Gallery Press
 1985: High Time (a version of Molière's A School for Husbands), Gallery Press
 1988: The Selected Poems of Philippe Jaccottet, Viking, 1988.
 1996: The Bacchae of Euripides, and Racine's Phaedra, Gallery Press
 2001. Jonathan Swift. Poems selected by Derek Mahon. Faber and Faber. .
 2002: Birds (a version of Oiseaux, by Saint-John Perse), Gallery Press
 2004: Cyrano de Bergerac. (A version of the play by Edmond Rostand), Gallery Press
 2005: Oedipus (A conflation of Sophocles' Oedipus Rex and Oedipus at Colonus), Gallery Press
 2006: Adaptations (A collection of versions, rather than translations proper, from poets such as Pasolini, Juvenal, Bertolt Brecht, Paul Valéry, Baudelaire, Rilke and Nuala Ní Dhomhnaill), Gallery Press

Non fiction
 1996: Journalism: selected prose, 1970–1995. Ed. Terence Brown. Gallery Press

Critical studies and reviews of Mahon's work
 Enniss, Stephen (2014) After the Titanic: A Life of Derek Mahon, Gill & Macmillan
 Haughton, Hugh (2007) The Poetry of Derek Mahon, Oxford University Press
 Jarniewicz, Jerzy (2013) Ekphrasis in the Poetry of Derek Mahon, NWP Piotrkow, 
 Review of Echo's grove.

Honours
 1965 – Eric Gregory Award for poetry
 1989 – Scott Moncrieff Translation Prize
 1990 – Lannan Literary Awards for Poetry
 1992 – The Irish Times-Aer Lingus Poetry Prize
 1995 – Honorary doctorate Trinity College Dublin.
 2001 – Honorary doctorate NUI Galway – for work reflecting the enduring aesthetic of achievement in contemporary Irish writing.
 2007 – David Cohen Prize for Literature – in recognition of his ‘lifetime’s achievement’
 Member, Aosdána 
 Irish Academy of Letters Award
 Guggenheim Fellowship
 2020 – Irish Times Poetry Now award

See also

 List of Northern Irish writers

References

Further reading
 Allen Randolph, Jody. Derek Mahon: A Comprehensive Bibliography. Irish University Review: Special Issue: Derek Mahon 24.1 (Spring/Summer 1994): 131–156.
 Reggiani, Enrico. In Attesa della Vita, Introduzione alla Poetica di Derek Mahon, Vita e Pensiero, Milano 1996, pp. 432 [seconda ristampa: 2005]
 Haughton, Hugh. The Poetry of Derek Mahon. Oxford: Oxford University Press, 2007.
 Jarniewicz, Jerzy. Ekphrasis in the Poetry of Derek Mahon, Piotrkow: NWP Press, 2013, pp. 275, 
 Christopher Steare: Derek Mahon : a study of his poetry, London : Greenwich Exchange, 2017,

External links

 Derek Mahon's page at Wake Forest University Press
 Griffin Poetry Prize biography
 Griffin Poetry Prize reading, including video clip
 "Achill" from poets.org.
 "A Disused Shed in Co. Wexford" from The Poem.
 "Painting into Poetry: The Case of Derek Mahon" by Rajeev S. Patke.
Stuart A. Rose Manuscript, Archives, and Rare Book Library, Emory University: Derek Mahon papers, 1948–2018
Stuart A. Rose Manuscript, Archives, and Rare Book Library, Emory University: Derek Mahon collection, 1985–1988, 1991, 2000
Letters and postcards from Derek Mahon to Louis Asekoff from 1963 to 1988: Stuart A. Rose Manuscript, Archives, and Rare Book Library, Emory University: Letters to Louis Asekoff, 1963–1988
 

1941 births
2020 deaths
Aosdána members
David Cohen Prize recipients
French–English translators
Writers from Belfast
Male poets from Northern Ireland
University of Paris alumni
Alumni of Trinity College Dublin
20th-century writers from Northern Ireland
20th-century poets from Northern Ireland
21st-century British poets
21st-century British male writers
20th-century Irish translators
21st-century translators
Male writers from Northern Ireland
20th-century British male writers
People from Kinsale